Formed in 1972 by voter initiative, the Midpeninsula Regional Open Space District (MROSD) is a non-enterprise special district in the San Francisco Bay Area. It has acquired and preserved a regional green belt of open space land and provides opportunities for ecologically-sensitive public enjoyment and education.

Its stated mission is:

To acquire and preserve a regional greenbelt of open space land in perpetuity; protect and restore the natural environment; and provide opportunities for ecologically sensitive public enjoyment and education.

The District, which includes parts of Santa Clara, San Mateo and Santa Cruz counties, works to form a continuous green belt of permanently preserved open space by linking its lands with other public park lands. A member of the Bay Area Open Space Council, the District also participates in cooperative efforts such as the San Francisco Bay Trail, Bay Area Ridge Trail, and Skyline-to-the-Sea Trail, which are regional trail systems in the Bay Area that include District lands.

The Midpeninsula Regional Open Space District has permanently preserved almost  of mountainous, foothill, and bayland open space, creating 26 open space preserves. Of the District's 26 preserves, 24 are open to the public free of charge, 365 days a year from dawn until one-half hour after sunset.

District revenues for fiscal year 2012-2013 were $33 million, with $30.3 million coming directly from a portion of property taxes. The District also occasionally receives state and federal grants, as well as private donations.

Recreation
Most of the preserves are open to recreation. Popular activities are hiking, cycling, and horseback riding. Paragliding and hang gliding are permitted at Windy Hill Open Space Preserve with a special use permit. Camping is generally prohibited, though the Monte Bello Open Space Preserve does have a backpacking camp available by permit only. Of the 26 preserves, 24 are fully open to the public: Miramontes Ridge Open Space Preserve and Tunitas Creek Open Space Preserve are not open; the Bear Creek Redwoods Open Space Preserve and La Honda Creek Open Space Preserve require a permit for use, and portions of Sierra Azul Open Space Preserve are closed to the public due to hazardous areas at the summit of Mount Umunhum.

Preserves are relatively undeveloped, with most having only a parking area, trail signs, and possibly an outhouse. All preserves are open from dawn to one-half hour after sunset.

Park Rangers patrol the District and provide a range of services. Ranger staff are peace officers but do not carry firearms.  They wear tan and green uniforms; the badge is a gold metal seven-point star with an enameled California state seal in the center. Dispatch services are provided by the Mountain View Police Department under contract.

Open space preserves
The following open space preserves are managed by MROSD:

 Bear Creek Redwoods Open Space Preserve
 Coal Creek Open Space Preserve
 El Corte de Madera Creek Open Space Preserve (see also El Corte de Madera Creek)
 El Sereno Open Space Preserve
 Foothills Open Space Preserve
 Fremont Older Open Space Preserve
 La Honda Creek Open Space Preserve, opened to the public in November 2017 
 Long Ridge Open Space Preserve
 Los Trancos Open Space Preserve
 Miramontes Ridge Open Space Preserve
 Monte Bello Open Space Preserve
 Picchetti Ranch Open Space Preserve (see also Picchetti Winery)
 Pulgas Ridge Open Space Preserve
 Purisima Creek Redwoods Open Space Preserve
 Rancho San Antonio Open Space Preserve
 Ravenswood Open Space Preserve
 Russian Ridge Open Space Preserve
 St. Joseph's Hill Open Space Preserve
 Saratoga Gap Open Space Preserve
 Sierra Azul Open Space Preserve
 Skyline Ridge Open Space Preserve
 Steven's Creek Shoreline Nature Study Area Open Space Preserve
 Teague Hill Open Space Preserve
 Thornewood Open Space Preserve
 Tunitas Creek Open Space Preserve
 Windy Hill Open Space Preserve

Further reading
Room to Breathe: The Wild Heart of the San Francisco Peninsula, Edited by Kristi Britt. Berkeley:Heyday Books (2012) 
The Country in the City,  Richard Walker. Seattle: University of Washington Press (2007)

References

External links

 Midpeninsula Regional Open Space District openspace.org Home Page
 Information on District Preserve

 

 
Parks in the San Francisco Bay Area
Nature reserves in California
 
 
 
Special districts of California
Park districts in California
Non-profit organizations based in California
1972 establishments in California